Scytothamnus is a brown algae genus in the family Splachnidiaceae.

Species 
 Scytothamnus australis (J.Agardh) J.D.Hooker & Harvey - type
 Scytothamnus fasciculatus (J.D.Hooker & Harvey) A.D.Cotton
 Scytothamnus hirsutus Skottsberg
 Scytothamnus rugulosus (Bory de Saint-Vincent) De Toni

See also 
 List of brown algal genera

References

External links 
 algaebase

Scytothamnales
Brown algae genera
Taxa named by Joseph Dalton Hooker
Taxa named by William Henry Harvey